The 1962 Colorado State Rams football team represented Colorado State University in the Skyline Conference during the 1962 NCAA University Division football season.  In their first season under head coach Mike Lude, the Rams lost all ten games and were outscored 269 to 66. The winless season extended the program's losing streak to 26 games, dating back to October 1960. The streak was broken with a win in the 1963 season opener.

The team's statistical leaders included John Christensen with 562 passing yards, Phil Jackson with 314 rushing yards, and John Swanson with 160 receiving yards.

The Rams opened the season at Air Force in the inaugural game at the new Falcon Stadium.

Schedule

References

Colorado State
Colorado State Rams football seasons
College football winless seasons
Colorado State Rams football